Gippsland Grammar School is one of Australia’s leading co-educational Anglican schools, with a tradition of excellence in education extending almost 100 years. Located in the heart of Gippsland, the School has more than 1100 students across three campuses including St Anne’s junior campus (ELC to Year 6) and the Garnsey senior campus (Years 7-12), both at Sale, and the Bairnsdale junior campus (ELC to Year 6) in East Gippsland. Gippsland Grammar is also the only boarding school east of Melbourne’s suburban fringe and is a home-away-from-home for students from far East Gippsland, South Gippsland, Victoria’s High Country and the Latrobe Valley as well as for a cohort of international students.

Gippsland Grammar's motto is Veritas Liberabit Vos, Latin for "the truth will set you free."

Gippsland Grammar is a member of the South Eastern Independent Schools Association (SEISA) and ICCES schools associations.

Michele Wakeham is the current Principal and was appointed in November 2022.

History 
St Anne's Church of England Girls School was founded in 1924. Gippsland Grammar School for boys commenced in 1961.  The two schools amalgamated as St. Anne's and Gippsland Grammar School in 1971. For a period of time, the School was known by the acronym STAGGS, but became known as Gippsland Grammar in 1997.

Facilities

Garnsey Campus 
The Garnsey Campus is the school's senior campus, teaching students years 7 to 12. There are  four or five classes at each year level from 7 to 11, each class consisting of around 20 students.

The Garnsey Campus teaches students the core subjects; English, Mathematics, Science, Geography, History and Health, as well as a variety of electives including Art, Drama, Woodwork, Music, French and Japanese.

The facility is designed to cater for advancing electronic communication, and learning is located on the campus, for the use of both staff and students. These such advances can be accessed from the Information Services Centre, which provides a networked information system, an information and literacy skills program, instruction in using online services, reading programs, photocopying, a range of audiovisual equipment and reading and games for recreational purposes.

The Garnsey Campus is also host to the year 9 Centre.

Blackwood boarding house 
The Boarding House is situated at the Garnsey Campus and is home to approximately 40 female and male students from years 7 to 12. Boarders can stay as weekly's (Monday - Thursday) or as full timer's, such as interstate and international boarders.

Students have access to study facilities including; a study room with a well stocked library with school texts and a range of reference books, a computer room with computers which are linked to the school system and which have internet, intranet and school e-mail access, and teachers and tutors for a variety of subjects.

Students have regular, nutritional meals, cooked by the Boarding House Chef at the Boarding House. Boarders also have access to the newly developed and widely acclaimed electronic canteen system.

The Boarding House is only a short stroll from many locations including; rowing sheds, netball courts, the shopping centre and the local pool and is in close proximity to many other sporting facilities.

For Boarders that chose to stay on weekends there are a variety of activities undertaken such as; cinema evenings and ten pin bowling and trips such as; surfing trips to Cape Coonran and an annual snow trip to Mount Hotham.

NOTE: The boarding house has recently moved to being on the Garnsey Campus, rather than the St Annes Campus.

St. Anne's Campus 
This is also situated in Sale and teaches students from ages 3, in the early learning centre, to year six.

It also has a Library Resource Centre with up-to-date fiction and non-fiction collections and a strong reference section, computers for educational games and research and library classes conducted each week to promote information literacy.

Bairnsdale Campus 
This is the most recent campus, it is for years preparatory to 6. The new campus offers many of the subjects that are available at the St. Anne's campus including; a full curriculum at all grade levels with specialist teachers for Art, Music, Japanese and Sport/PE.

Curriculum
A broad curriculum encompasses the Arts, Commerce, Christian Education, Humanities, Science, Mathematics and Technology, Languages (Japanese and French), Visual Communication & Design, Ceramics and Art. 
An innovative program has been developed for Year 9. Students enjoy a wide range of "out-of-classroom" activities, including two weeks in the Melbourne city classroom. Other activities include a comprehensive Outdoor Education program, with hiking trips and ski camps together with a Netbook Computer program which enables unprecedented elearning opportunities.

Houses 
Gippsland Grammar has four Houses which participate annually in a competition which includes academic, cultural and sporting pursuits. These include interhouse Swimming, Athletics, Cross Country, Drama, Debating, Art, Music/Cultural Festival & Rowing. The winner is awarded the Inter House Trophy for the year. They are as follows: 
Cranswick Dargo (Royal blue)
Tisdall Hotham (Gold)
Wellington Binks (Maroon)
Blundell Bogong (Red)

Each House is named after a significant person and a place which has a connection to the surrounding areas of Gippsland: Blundell, Cranswick and Tisdall were the names of the St. Anne's houses and Bogong and Dargo were the Gippsland Grammar School's sporting houses. Hotham was created at the time of amalgamation and 1984 was the inaugural year of Wellington-Binks.

Alumni 
 Lindsay Tanner — former Federal Finance Minister, Labor politician.
 Wil Anderson — comedian.
 Andrew McQualter - midfielder with St Kilda Football Club.
 Christine Kininmonth — broadcaster, inventor and regular panellist on the ABC television programme, The New Inventors.
 Simon Gregory — scientist involved in the Human Genome Project.
 James Tomkins - Olympic rowing gold medallist.
 Xavier Ellis — midfielder with Hawthorn Football Club
 Martin Bean — vice-chancellor of the Open University
 Craig Huffer — middle-distance runner
 Irving Mosquito - Australian rules footballer for the Essendon Bombers.
 Paige Barr - national representative rower.

See also 
 List of schools in Victoria
List of boarding schools
 Victorian Certificate of Education
 Head of the River (Victoria)

References

External links 
 Gippsland Grammar School website

Grammar schools in Australia
Anglican secondary schools in Victoria (Australia)
Gippsland Independent Schools
Educational institutions established in 1924
Junior School Heads Association of Australia Member Schools
Sale, Victoria
Boarding schools in Victoria (Australia)
1924 establishments in Australia